The steamboat Comet was the second steamboat to navigate the Ohio and Mississippi rivers. Comets owner was Daniel D. Smith and she was launched in 1813 at Pittsburgh, Pennsylvania. With an engine and power train designed and built by Daniel French, the Comet was the first of the Western steamboats to be powered by a horizontal high-pressure engine with its piston rod connected to a stern paddle wheel. Smith was the first to defy the steamboat monopoly in Orleans Territory granted to Robert R. Livingston and Robert Fulton.

Pittsburgh
Daniel French built Comet steam engine and drive train at Brownsville, Pennsylvania, and installed them in the steamboat at Pittsburgh prior to July 13, 1813, her first voyage. The Pittsburgh Gazette announced that Comet had departed Pittsburgh for Louisville, Kentucky, on July 13:

On September 7, 1813, Robert Fulton wrote to John Livingston at Pittsburgh requesting specific information about the Comet. In October 1813 a public notice was published in The Pittsburgh Gazette:

On November 11, 1813, Fulton wrote to Livingston at Pittsburgh:

No trial date was entered in the docket book at the Allegheny County Courthouse. Apparently, the threatened lawsuit was not pursued.

New Orleans
After steaming from Pittsburgh to the port of New Orleans, the Comet was entered for the first time in the New Orleans Wharf Register on February 25, 1814. Payment of the wharfage fee, in the amount of "$6", for the "Steam Boat, Capt. Lake" was recorded. Subsequent entries  in the New Orleans Wharf Register, on March 15, April 7, May 2 and July 3, 1814, identified the Comet as "Steam Boat (Lake)", with a wharfage fee of $6.

Citations

References
Congressional Edition, Volume 2552 (1889). The executive documents of the House of Representatives for the first session of the Fiftieth Congress, 1887-'88. Washington: Government Printing Office
Cox, Thomas H. (2009). Gibbons v. Ogden, law, and society in the early republic. Ohio, Athens: Ohio University Press, 264 pages.
Henshaw, Marc Nicholas (2014). "Hog chains and Mark Twains: a study of labor history, archaeology, and industrial ethnography of the steamboat era of the Monongahela Valley 1811-1950." Dissertation, Michigan Technological University
Hunter, Louis C. (1993), Steamboats on the western rivers, an economic and technological history. New York: Dover Publications
Johnson, Leland R. (2011). "Harbinger of Revolution", in Full steam ahead: reflections on the impact of the first steamboat on the Ohio River, 1811-2011. Rita Kohn, editor. Indianapolis: Indiana Historical Society Press, pp. 1–16. 
Kunz, George Frederick (1910). Hudson-Fulton celebration: a collection of the catalogues issued by the museums and institutions in New York City and vicinities. New York: Trow Press.
Lloyd, James T. (1856), Lloyd's steamboat directory, and disasters on the western waters..., Philadelphia: Jasper Harding
Miller, Ernest C., '"Pennsylvania's oil industry", Pennsylvania History Studies, No. 4, Pennsylvania History Association, Gettysburg, Pa. 1954-1974
Morrison, John Harrison (1908). History of American steam navigation. New York: W. F. Sametz
New Orleans Wharf RegisterA handwritten document (mostly in French) recording the date of arrival, name, type and fee for each boat in the port of New Orleans. Registration was suspended from December 16, 1814 until January 28, 1815.New Orleans Public Library, 219 Loyola Avenue, New Orleans, LA 70112-2044Call number: QN420 1806-1823, New Orleans (La.) Collector of Levee Dues. Registers of flatboats, barges, rafts, and steamboats in the port of New Orleans, 1806-1823.

Steamboats of the Mississippi River
Steamboats of the Ohio River
Ships built in Pittsburgh
1813 ships